The Felchbach is a river of Bavaria, Germany. It flows into the Swabian Rezat near Weißenburg in Bayern.

See also
List of rivers of Bavaria

References

Rivers of Bavaria
Weißenburg-Gunzenhausen
Rivers of Germany